Return of the Living Dead Part II is a 1988 American comedy horror film written and directed by Ken Wiederhorn, and starring Michael Kenworthy, Marsha Dietlein, Dana Ashbrook, Thom Mathews, James Karen, and Phil Bruns. It is the first of four sequels to The Return of the Living Dead.

The film was released by Lorimar Motion Pictures on January 15, 1988, and was a minor box office success, making over $9 million at the box office in the United States against its $6.2 million budget.

Plot
During the zombie outbreak in Louisville, a military truck is transporting barrels of Trioxin, when one breaks loose and falls into a river without the driver noticing. The next morning, pre-teens Johnny and Billy take a reluctant Jesse Wilson to a cemetery mausoleum for a group initiation with a group of pre-teen bullies. Frightened, Jesse flees into a nearby storm drain, where he and the others stumble across the rogue barrel. Upon opening it, they find a corpse inside and running away screaming as the toxic gas contained within begins to leak out. When Jesse says he's going to call the Army from a number on the barrel, the bullies trap him in the derelict mausoleum and leave him.

Billy and Johnny return to the barrel and open it, releasing the Trioxin gas that begins to permeate the whole cemetery. A trio of grave robbers; Ed, Joey, and Brenda, arrive via van. Brenda is creeped out by cemeteries and stays behind in the van. Ed and Joey go into the cemetery where they start to loot the tombs in the mausoleum where Jesse is. When they enter it, Jesse is able to break free and run home. Meanwhile, acid rainfall causes the Trioxin to begin seeping into the ground and reanimating the corpses.

Returning home, Jesse is ordered to do his homework by his older sister, Lucy, but sneaks out of the house when a cable repairman, Tom, distracts her. He goes to Billy's house to see him, but he has suddenly fallen ill, so he makes up an excuse and Billy's mother allows him in for a brief visit. Suffering from the effects of Trioxin, Billy warns Jesse not to tell anyone what they've found. Against his friend's wishes, Jesse returns to the sewer to further examine the barrel. Upon seeing a tar-covered zombie, he flees to the cemetery, where the newly resurrected bodies begin to dig their way out of the ground.  Meanwhile, Brenda goes to check on her companions and encounters a zombie, but is able to get away. Ed and Joey are still inside the mausoleum when a corpse comes to life. Joey smashes its head with a crowbar, and they flee the building. They are running through a mob of zombies when they run into a hysterical Brenda.

Jesse gets home and tries to tell Lucy about the zombie uprising, but she dismisses him and locks him in his room. Elsewhere, Ed, Joey, and Brenda show up at Billy's house to get help but they run away when Billy's dad pulls a shotgun on them. Meanwhile, Jesse starts a fire outside his door to set off the smoke alarms, to distract Lucy so he can escape. Jesse calls the Army and gets through to Colonel Glover, who had helped put down the Louisville outbreak days earlier, but the call gets disconnected. Ed, Joey, and Brenda steal Tom's van but are unable to get through the zombie horde, so they barge into Jesse's house. Joey begins to fall ill from Trioxin exposure. As the zombies close in on the house, the graverobbers attempt to find a getaway car. They manage to break into a doctor's house, where they convince him to let them use his car, and they drive to a hospital emergency room that appears to be deserted.

At Billy's house, his condition worsens and his father leaves to get a doctor, but Billy's mother sees him being attacked and eaten by a group of zombies. Fully turned, Billy proceeds to attack his mother. Elsewhere, Tom, Lucy, and Jesse escape a group of zombies and take the car to look around town. They make it to Lucy and Jesse's grandfather's house and break into his gun safe to get weapons and ammo. They go back to the hospital where Ed and Joey are experiencing symptoms of rigor mortis. Jesse is attacked by a zombie that both he and Tom shot multiple times. Brenda is upset about the diagnosis for Joey, and they try to leave in the car, but Ed follows them and gets in the car. They are stopped at gunpoint by National Guardsman under Glover's command. A fully zombified Ed attacks and kills one of the soldiers, causing his squadmates to flee. Brenda drives away with Joey, leaving Ed behind. Brenda is attacked by a zombified Joey, and unable to kill her former lover she willfully lets him cannibalize her.

Fleeing in a stolen ambulance, the survivors come to a roadblock, and the National Guard mistakenly opens fire on them, thinking they are zombies. Realizing that the whole town had been evacuated, Tom thinks of a new strategy to give the zombies what they want, drives them to a meat packing plant. They take a truck and distribute brains out of the back as they drive to a power plant intending to electrocute them all. Billy opens the gate and zombies corner them into the truck. Jesse is attacked by Billy and stabs him with a screwdriver, and then activates the power, killing all of the zombies. Billy walks in, holding the screwdriver, and Jesse pushes his tormenter into a large transformer that falls through the roof. Glover and his men arrive to contain the scene and lead the others away.

Cast
 Michael Kenworthy as Jesse Wilson
 Marsha Dietlein as Lucy Wilson
 Dana Ashbrook as Tom Essex
 James Karen as Ed Mathews
 Thom Mathews as Joey Hazel
 Suzanne Snyder as Brenda Herzog 
 Phil Bruns as "Doc" Mandel
 Thor Van Lingen as Billy Crowley
 Jason Hogan as Johnny
 Mitch Pileggi as Sarge
 Jonathan Terry as Colonel Glover
 Sally Smythe as Mildred Crowley
 Don Maxwell as George Crowley
 Forrest J Ackerman as Harvey Kramer
 Allan Trautman as Tarman Zombie 
 Douglas Benson as High-Pitched Voice Zombie

Soundtrack
Released on Island Records in 1988.

"Space Hopper" by Julian Cope
"High Priest of Love" by Zodiac Mindwarp and the Love Reaction
"I'm the Man (Def Uncensored version)" by Anthrax
"Big Band B-Boy" by Mantronix
"Monster Mash" by The Big O
"Alone in the Night" by Leatherwolf
"A.D.I./Horror of It All" by Anthrax
"Flesh to Flesh" by Joe Lamont
"The Dead Return" by J. Peter Robinson

Although not included on the soundtrack, "Bad Case of Loving You" by Robert Palmer is also featured in the movie.

Reception
On Rotten Tomatoes, the film holds a 5% rating from 21 reviews. On Metacritic it has a rating of 45 based on 6 critic reviews indicating "mixed or average reviews".

Home video
The film was released on DVD in 2004, containing a heavily altered soundtrack.

Actress Marsha Dietlein was asked in an August 2012 interview if the film would receive a newer and perhaps "special" DVD release, as was recently done for the first installment in the franchise. "I wish they would do a retrospective, but I haven't heard anything about it," she said.

The film was given a Blu-ray release in 2018 by Shout! Factory. It contains a new 2K scan of the interpositive, plus a bunch of new special features that were not on the DVD. Along with that, it also restores the original theatrical soundtrack that was omitted on the DVD release.

References

External links

1988 films
1988 horror films
1980s comedy horror films
1980s science fiction horror films
American comedy horror films
American satirical films
American science fiction horror films
American sequel films
American zombie comedy films
Films directed by Ken Wiederhorn
Return of the Living Dead (film series)
Films scored by J. Peter Robinson
1988 comedy films
1980s English-language films
1980s American films
Grave-robbing in film